Brave is a free and open-source web browser developed by Brave Software, Inc. based on the Chromium web browser. Brave is a privacy-focused browser, which automatically blocks online advertisements and website trackers in its default settings. It also provides users the choice to turn on optional ads that pay users for their attention in the form of Basic Attention Tokens (BAT) cryptocurrency. Users can then send contributions to websites and content creators, which support BAT in the form of tips along with the ability to keep the cryptocurrency they earned.

Brave Software's headquarters are in San Francisco, California.

As of August 2022, Brave claims to have more than 57.42 million monthly active users, 19.3 million daily active users and a network of more than 1.6 million content creators.

History
On 28 May 2015, CEO Brendan Eich and CTO Brian Bondy founded Brave Software. On 20 January 2016, Brave Software launched the first version of Brave with ad-blocking capabilities and announced plans for a privacy-respecting ad platform.

In June 2018, Brave released a pay-to-surf test-version of the browser. This version of Brave came preloaded with approximately 250 ads and sent a detailed log of the user's browsing activity to Brave for the short-term purpose of testing this functionality. Brave announced that expanded trials would follow. Later that month, Brave added support for Tor in its desktop browser's private-browsing mode.

Until December 2018, Brave ran on a fork of Electron called Muon, which they marketed as a "more secure fork". Nevertheless, Brave developers moved to Chromium, citing a need to ease their maintenance burden. Brave Software released the final Muon-based version with the intention that it would stop working and instructed users to update as its end-of-life approached.

In June 2019, Brave started testing a new ad-blocking rule-matching algorithm implemented in Rust, replacing the previous C++ one. The uBlock Origin and Ghostery algorithms inspired the new logic, which Brave claims to be on average 69 times faster than the previous algorithm.

Brave launched its stable release, version 1.0, on 13 November 2019, while having 8.7 million monthly active users overall. At the time, it had approximately 3 million active users on a daily basis. Brave 1.0, running on Android, iOS, Windows 10, macOS, or Linux, integrated "almost all of Brave's marquee features across all platforms", according to Engadget.

In November 2020, Brave reported having 20 million monthly users, and, in September 2021, it passed 36 million monthly active users.

In March 2021, Brave built its search engine out of Tailcat, which it acquired earlier that year from Cliqz, a subsidiary of Hubert Burda Media based in Germany. Tailcat was designed to deliver search results without logging user activity or creating profiles.

In April 2021, Brave became the first browser to be added to the Epic Games Store.

In June 2021, the public beta for Brave Search, Brave Software's search engine, was launched. It exited its beta phase in June 2022 along with an announcement that within its year-long beta testing period Brave Search surpassed 2.5 billion total queries.

Business model
Brave uses its Basic Attention Token (BAT) to drive revenue. Originally incorporated in Delaware as Hyperware Labs, Inc. in 2015, the company later changed its name to Brave Software, Inc. and registered in California, where it is headquartered.

By August 2016, the company had received at least US$7 million in angel investments from venture capital firms, including Peter Thiel's Founders Fund, Propel Venture Partners, Pantera Capital, Foundation Capital, and the Digital Currency Group.

In November 2019, Brave launched Brave Ads, an ad network. Brave Software takes 30% of the ad revenue and the rest is given back to the users. As consumers browse, they are presented with advertisements.

Features

Brave Firewall + VPN
Brave Firewall + VPN is a browser based system wide firewall and VPN for iOS. It uses the Guardian VPN.

Brave Search

Brave Search is a search engine developed by Brave and released in Beta form in March 2021, following the acquisition of Tailcat, a privacy-focused search engine from Cliqz. Since October 2021, Brave Search is the default search engine for Brave browser users in the United States, Canada, United Kingdom, France, and Germany.

Brave Wallet 
Brave Wallet is a native crypto wallet with no extensions required. It supports all EVM compatible chains (Polygon, xDai, Avalanche, etc.) and L2 chains. The Brave Wallet support is limited to Desktop browser, but is planned to be extended to mobile browsers. In addition, Brave Wallet can be used to store non-fungible tokens.

Brave Wallet (Legacy) 
Brave Wallet (Legacy) is a fork of MetaMask, which comes pre-installed with the Brave browser. This lets the browser interact with websites supporting the MetaMask API's to sign crypto transactions for supported Ethereum Virtual Machine networks.

Brave Swap 
Brave Swap is an aggregator for cryptocurrency DEX's based on 0x. It lets users swap Ethereum tokens for other tokens from within the browser. Brave makes money off this by taking a small "router" fee. It plans to return 20% of this fee to the user in the form of BAT tokens.

Privacy
All user data is kept private on the user's device and is not accessible by any third party. The browsing data is not sent to Brave's servers, so only the user of the device can see the browsing data.  A research study analyzing browser privacy by Professor Douglas J. Leith of the University of Dublin reported that Brave had the highest level of privacy of the browsers tested.  Brave did not have "any use of identifiers allowing tracking of IP address overtime, and no sharing of the details of web pages visited with backend servers".

To prevent browser fingerprinting, Brave uses fingerprint randomization, which makes the browser look different to websites over browser restart, to ensure Brave's users cannot be uniquely identified or tracked periodically by using browser fingerprinting.

On 15 October 2021, Brave announced a new privacy feature dubbed "debouncing". The new feature is designed to disarm bounce tracking, a method of Internet tracking through intermediary domains that load when users click on a link. Debouncing will automatically recognize when users are about to visit a known tracking domain and renavigates the user to their intended destination, skipping the tracking site altogether.

Tests conducted by Digital Trends found Brave to be the only mainstream browser to pass the Electronic Frontier Foundation's Cover Your Tracks test.

In April 2022, Brave announced a de-AMP feature that bypasses Google's AMP system, directing the user straight to the original website instead. The company cited this as a privacy feature, calling AMP "harmful to users and to the Web at large".

Brave Shields
Brave Shields is an engine inspired by uBlock Origin and others, which blocks third-party ads and trackers in a similar fashion to other extension-based ad blockers. The advertisement blocking features are enabled by default. Users are given control to adjust ad blocking, script, and cookies settings in the Shields and Privacy section of the browser. As well as ads and cookie-based trackers, Brave shields also protect against fingerprint tracking using a technique it calls "farbling", allowing each browser session to appear unique.

Brave Talk
Brave Talk is a browser-based video conferencing tool based on Jitsi. It was integrated into Brave in September 2021. Brave Talk has both free and paid tiers.

Brave Rewards
Since April 2019, users of the Brave browser can opt in to the Brave Rewards feature, which enables users to earn BAT as a reward for viewing privacy-preserving ads and use earned BAT in a number of ways.

Users can earn BAT by viewing advertisements that are displayed as notifications by the operating system of their computer or device or as a native pop-up window. Advertising campaigns are matched with users by inference from their browsing history; this targeting is carried out locally, with no transmission of personal data outside the browser. 

Users may choose to send BAT micropayments to websites and content creators within the ecosystem. Site owners and creators must first register with Brave as a publisher. Users can either turn on auto-contribute, which automatically divides a specified monthly contribution in proportion to the time spent, or they can manually send a chosen amount (referred to as a tip) while visiting the site or creator. In addition or alternatively, users may withdraw their BAT to a verified Uphold or Gemini wallet.

The first version of the micropayments feature was launched in 2016 under the name "Brave Payments" and used Bitcoin. Advertisements were shown in a separate browser tab.

Tor windows
Tor - Brave offers Tor, .onion, and Tor bridges support in its desktop version. Users can switch to Tor-enabled browsing by clicking on the hamburger menu in the top-right corner of the browser.

Other features
SugarCoat: A tool integrated in Brave since the fourth quarter of 2021 that automatically replaces tracking libraries with a spoofed, privacy-preserving replacement to increase site compatibility with adblocking scripts.
InterPlanetary File System (IPFS): In January 2021, Brave became one of the first web browsers to offer native integration with a peer-to-peer networking protocol.
Blockchain domain names: As of March 2021, Brave supports decentralized domains, namely the ones provided by Unstoppable Domains (.crypto etc.) and Ethereum Name Services (ENS).
News aggregator: In December 2020, Brave integrated a personalized news reader focused on user privacy into the browser. It was renamed from Brave Today to Brave News in 2021. As of June 2021, the news feed also includes promoted articles based upon the Brave ads platform.
Wayback Machine Integration: In February 2020, the Wayback Machine was integrated into the browser. Upon hitting an HTTP 404 error, among other error codes, the Wayback Machine is automatically queried to display a cached version of the page.
Brave Playlist: An iOS feature that lets users create playlists containing content from a variety of media sources, including both audio and video streams.
De-AMP: In May 2020, Brave began to roll out an update to its mobile clients that would automatically bypass Google's AMP pages.

Basic Attention Token 

The "Basic Attention Token" (BAT) is a cryptocurrency token based on Ethereum, created for use in an open-source, decentralized ad exchange platform and as a cryptocurrency. It is based on the ERC-20 standard.

In an initial coin offering on 31 May 2017, Brave sold one billion BAT for a total of 156,250 Ethereum ($35 million) in less than 30 seconds. An additional 500 million BAT was retained by the company to be used to promote the adoption of the platform.

In early December 2017, the company disbursed the first round of its "user growth pool" grants: a total of 300,000 BAT was distributed to new users on a first-come, first-served basis.

Advertisers must purchase BAT to show ads on the Brave Rewards platform. Brave facilitates USD-based ad purchases, but will then buy BAT on behalf of the advertiser. These ads are then shown to the user, where the user then receives the BAT spent on the ad, minus a 30% fee going to Brave. Users can then tip creators using the "Brave Creators" platform (creators being hosts of websites the user has visited or literal creators on platforms such as YouTube), or withdraw their BAT to a verified Gemini or Uphold wallet.

In March 2021, BAT became available on the Binance Smart Chain in the form of wrapped BAT. These tokens are wrapped by Binance and the original BAT is held in "Token Vaults" with Binance.

Partnerships 
HTC: In December 2018, Brave partnered with HTC to make Brave Browser the default browser on the HTC Exodus 1.

Reception 
In January 2016, in reaction to Brave Software's initial announcement, Sebastian Anthony of Ars Technica described Brave as a "cash-grab" and a "double dip". Anthony concluded, "Brave is an interesting idea, but generally it's rather frowned upon to stick your own ads in front of someone else's". TechCrunch, Computerworld, and Engadget termed Brave's ad replacement plans "controversial" in 2016.

In February 2016, Andy Patrizio of Network World reviewed a pre-release version of Brave. Patrizio criticized the browser's feature set as "mighty primitive", but lauded its performance: "Pages load instantly. I can't really benchmark page loads since they happen faster than I can start/stop the stopwatch".

In April 2016, the CEO of the Newspaper Association of America, David Chavern, said that Brave's proposed replacement of advertising "should be viewed as illegal and deceptive by the courts, consumers, and those who value the creation of content".

In April 2017, TechWorld praised Brave's "great speeds and advanced ad-tracking controls", but said that its "extension functionality is still lacking".

In November 2019, CNET reviewed the newly released 1.0 version of Brave. They praised the speed, saying "Brave is hands-down the fastest browser I've used this year on any operating system, for both mobile and desktop. Memory usage by the browser is far below most others, while website loading is far faster." They also said battery usage could be reduced by using the browser – "With less strain on resources comes less strain on your device's battery life as well." However, they had concerns that the user base is still far below Chrome, and thus it may not be able to build out its ad system fully yet, saying – "The browser will need more users, however, to truly build out its new ad system: while 8 million people is a good start, it will still need to compete with Google Chrome's billion-plus users."

In March 2021, The New York Times analyzed internet browsers and recommended Brave as the best privacy browser. Writer Brian X. Chen concluded, "My favorite websites loaded flawlessly, and I enjoyed the clean look of ad-free sites, along with the flexibility of opting in to see ads whenever I felt like it."

Controversies

Brave browser collecting donations on behalf of content creators
In December 2018, British YouTube content creator Tom Scott said that he had not received any donations collected on his behalf by Brave. In a tweet, he stated "So if you thought you'd donated to me through Brave, the money (or their pseudo-money [BAT]) will not reach me, and Brave's terms say that they may choose to just keep it for themselves. It looks like they're 'providing this service' for every creator on every platform. No opt-in, no consent." In response, Brave amended the interface with a disclaimer for each creator who has not signed up with Brave and promised to consider adding "an opt-out option for creators who do not wish to receive donations" and "switching the default so users cannot tip or donate to unverified creators".

Critics stated that the system should be opt-in and not opt-out, that the disclaimer did not clearly state absence of any relation with the creators, and suggests that creator begun process of signing up with Brave. Two days after the complaint, Brave issued an update to "clearly indicate which publishers and creators have not yet joined Brave Rewards so users can better control how they donate and tip" and in January 2020 another update to change the behavior of contributions and tips. They are now held in the browser and transferred if the creator signs up within 90 days; otherwise, they are returned to the user. Tom Scott, the original complainant, tweeted in response: "These are good changes, and they fix the complaints I had!".

Insertion of referral codes
On 6 June 2020, a Twitter user pointed out that Brave inserts affiliate referral codes when users navigate to Binance. Further research revealed that Brave also redirected the URLs of other cryptocurrency exchange websites. In response to the backlash from the users, Brave's CEO apologized and called it a "mistake" and said "we're correcting".

Two days later, Brave released a new version which they said disabled the auto-completion to partner links, followed by a blog post explaining the issue and apologizing.

"Private Window with Tor" DNS leaks
One privacy issue appeared via a private disclosure on Brave's HackerOne bug bounty platform on 12 January 2021. The disclosure reported that Brave was sending DNS requests to ISP of the users instead of routing it through the Tor network, thus allowing ISPs to have knowledge of user's browsing sessions.

Brave fixed the issue in its Nightly channel soon after it was initially reported. Once the bug received public attention in mid-February from Twitter users verifying the vulnerability, the fix was soon uplifted to the Stable channel and landed in Brave 1.20.110.

Forks
Gab in April 2019 created a fork of Brave called Dissenter which bundled in their add-on of the same name after it was banned in the Chrome and Firefox stores. Eich criticized the decision to fork Brave as unnecessary and "parasitic".

Comparison with other browsers
A February 2020 research report published by the School of Computer Science and Statistics at Trinity College Dublin tested six browsers and deemed Brave to be the most private of them, in terms of phoning home: "In the first (most private) group lies Brave, in the second Chrome, Firefox and Safari, and in the third (least private) group lie Edge and Yandex."

References

2016 software
Cross-platform web browsers
Free web browsers
Online advertising
MacOS web browsers
Software based on WebKit
Android web browsers
Linux web browsers
Windows web browsers
Free and open-source Android software
Tor onion services